Bangkok Airways Flight 266 was a scheduled domestic passenger flight from Krabi Airport to Samui Airport, Thailand. On 4 August 2009, the aircraft overran the runway on landing and crashed into an old and unmanned control tower. One pilot died and 41 other people were injured.

Aircraft

The aircraft involved was an ATR 72-212A, registration HS-PGL, msn 670. The aircraft made its first flight on 6 June 2001 with French registration F-WWER. It entered service with Bangkok Airways on 16 July 2001 re-registered HS-PGL. On 29 May 2006, it entered service with Siem Reap Airways International, returning to Bangkok Airways on 7 January 2009 after Siem Reap Airways International ceased trading. The aircraft was named Pha Ngan, and has been in service for approx. 20,000 hrs.

Accident

The aircraft is reported to have skidded off the runway and hit an old and unmanned control tower that was used as a fire-fighting station. The accident happened at around 14:15 local time (07:15 UTC). One pilot was reported to have been killed. The co-pilot, who was stuck in the aircraft for more than two hours, was among the last evacuated from the stricken plane. Serious injuries included four passengers – two British, one Italian and one Swiss suffered broken legs, while two other British suffered less severe injuries. The co-pilot also had leg injuries.
A total of 41 people were injured. The METAR in force at the time of the accident was METAR VTSM 040700Z 29015KT 9000 FEW020TCU SCT120 BKN300 31/25 Q1007 A2974 TCU-NW.

The fuselage of the aircraft spent a few years on roadsides in different parts of Samui before being sunk in October 2013 as part of Majcha Air Samui Artificial Reef Project.

See also

Air France Flight 358 – an Airbus A340-300 that had overrun a runway at Toronto Pearson International Airport four years earlier.

References

External links

Accident in Samui on Tuesday 4 August 2009 Press Release – Bangkok Airways

2009 in Thailand
Accidents and incidents by airline of Thailand
Accidents and incidents involving the ATR 72
Airliner accidents and incidents involving runway overruns
Aviation accidents and incidents in 2009
Aviation accidents and incidents in Thailand
Surat Thani province
August 2009 events in Thailand